Shirak Plain, ( Shiraki dašt),
is a plain located in the Armenian Plateau, at the northwest of Armenia. It roughly occupies almost the entire area of Shirak Province, the southwestern parts of Lori Province, as well as the northern parts of Aragatsotn Province. 

Shirak plan stretches from the left bank of Akhurian River at the west, towards the Pambak Mountains at the east. The plain is dominated by the Shirak mountains from the north, while the volcanoes of Shara and Aragats form the southern and southeastern borders of the plain. Akhurian river separates the Shirak plain from the Kars volcanic plateau at the west, which is located at the right bank of the river in modern-day Turkey.

The elevation of the plain ranges between 1400 and 1900 meters above sea level.

Gyumri, Artik, Maralik and Talin are the main urban settlements within the Shirak Plain.

Gallery

References

Landforms of Armenia